Ashley Township is an inactive township in Pike County, in the U.S. state of Missouri.

Ashley Township was erected in 1852, taking its name from the community of Ashley, Missouri.

References

Townships in Missouri
Townships in Pike County, Missouri